Blake Mott (born 21 April 1996) is an Australian professional tennis player. He competes mainly in the Challenger Tour. He reached his career high singles ranking of World No. 220 in June 2017. He won his first Challenger title in the 2016 Launceston Tennis International and made his Grand Slam debut at the 2017 Australian Open after qualifying.

Career

2011–2013: Career beginnings
Mott made his ITF debut in May 2011 in the Sweden F3. He lost in round 1 to Julian Obry. He played around Europe throughout 2011, scoring his first win against Aviv Ben Shabat in August 2011. Throughout 2012, Mott played on the ITF circuit across winning two matches. Mott ended 2012 with a ranking of 1563.

In 2013, Mott began making second rounds of the ITF circuit and in July 2013, Mott qualified for his first ATP Challenger Tour main draw in Granby. He lost to Tatsuma Ito in round 1. In October 2013, Mott qualified for the 2013 Melbourne Challenger, winning his first Challenger matches against Nick Kyrgios and Jordan Thompson on the way to the quarter final where he lost to number 1 seed Matthew Ebden. Mott ended 2013 with a ranking of 653.

2014–2015: First ITF Finals 
In 2014, Mott contested the 2014 Australian Open – Men's singles qualifying, losing to Enrique López-Pérez. Mott returned to the Australian ITF circuit and in April, he reached his first final. He lost in straight sets against Alex Bolt. Mott travelled to Asia and attempted to qualify for four Challenger events, qualifying only for the Taipei Challenger;. He lost to Hiroki Moriya in round 1. Mott travelled to Europe and North America and reached his second career final in Canada in August where he lost to Liam Broady. Mott returned to Australia and played a number of ITF to complete the year.

In 2015, Mott was given wild cards in the qualifying rounds of the Brisbane International and Sydney International, but lost in round 1 of both. At the 2015 Australian Open – Men's singles qualifying, Mott defeated Arthur De Greef before losing to Alexander Kudryavtsev. The remainder of 2015 was spent across Australia and Asia on the ITF and Challenger Circuit. Mott ended 2015 with a ranking of 674.

2016: First Challenger Title
In 2016, Mott commenced the year at the Canberra Challenger, losing to Marcel Granollers in round 1. In February Mott won his first Challenger title at the Launceston Challenger, after qualifying. Mott become the first player outside the world’s top 700 to win an ATP Challenger title since Korea’s Yong-Kyu Lim in  2010. The win increased Motts ranking 356 places to a career-high ranking of 365. Two weeks later, Mott reached the final of the Australian F1 at Port Pirie, but lost to Christopher O'Connell. Mott travelled to North America and competed on the ITF and Challenger Circuit for 6 months; reaching two ITF semi-finals in Canada. In October, Mott returned to Australia and reached the finals of the Australian F7; losing to Jarmere Jenkins and Christopher O'Connell. These results improved Mott's ranking to within the top 300. Mott ended 2016 with a ranking of 286.

2017: Grand Slam debut and career break
Mott commenced 2017 with a wild card into the Happy Valley Challenger where he lost in round 1. Mott will make his grand slam debut at the 2017 Australian Open after qualifying. After qualifying, Mott said; "It's amazing stuff. To be playing in my first grand slam in my home country where I grew up playing tennis, watching on TV all those years – this is truly special." Mott lost in straight sets to 18th seed Richard Gasquet in round 1. In February, Mott reached his second Challenger Final in Burnie where he lost to compatriot Omar Jasika. In March, Mott travelled to Asia where he qualified for and reached the semi final of the Keio Challenger, before reaching the final of the Australia F2 final. In May, Mott travelled to Europe where he reached the semi final of Venice Challenge Save Cup. He lost in the second round at 2017 Wimbledon Championships – Men's singles qualifying and first round at 2017 US Open – Men's singles qualifying. This would be Mott's last match in two years as he commenced a career hiatus. Mott ended 2017 with a ranking of 281.

2018–2019: Hiatus and return 
In July 2019, Mott announced he intention to return to the sport in September, after a 2-year hiatus; after rediscovered his passion for the sport. He won an ITF title in his return tournament. In December 2019, Mott broke his wrist while playing in the 2020 Australian Open wildcard playoff.

In January 2021, Mott lost in the first round of 2021 Australian Open – Men's singles qualifying.

ATP Challenger and ITF Futures finals

Singles: 10 (3–7)

Doubles: 2 (0–2)

Performance timeline 

Current through the 2021 Murray River Open.

Singles

References

External links
 
 
 

Living people
1996 births
Australian male tennis players
Tennis people from New South Wales